Sawantwadi an aesthetic land of artists, is an integral part of the Konkan region which is in the mid-western coast of India.

The western coast of India since 1510 A.D. has assumed great importance in Indian history and history of international relations, Sawantwadi has right from the beginning played a significant role. The coast line of Sawantwadi was strategically important especially for the Europeans. The political boundaries of Sawantwadi fluctuated between the northern latitudes of 17 degree (north) and 15 degree (south) and between 73 degree and the sea-coast from Masure till the mouth of the river Kolwal. The northern boundary of Sawantwadi is formed by the river Gadnadi which rises near the Ghotge ghat and meets the sea near Sarjekot.

The Princely State of Sawantwadi was ruled by the Royal Family of Sawant Bhonsles’. The Palace of Sawantwadi built by Khem Sawant III during his reign from 1755 – 1803 stands as a pride of the city. The Palace has witnessed the ordinance of 8 gallant rulers after Khem Sawant III and it still continues to witness two generations after them who are filled with a glowing pride about their family and their great heritage of the art of Ganjifa and Lacquerware.

History 
The Sawant's, in early seventeenth century, were the feudal holders of the hereditary right of DESHMUKH under the rule of Adil Shahi, whom they regarded as their master. The Marathas under Shivaji and Portuguese at Goa were the other two important powers which came into contact with Sawantwadi.

The Mulpurush (first man) of the Sawant Bhonsle, Mangal or Mang Sawant belonged to the Sisodia Rajput family from Udaipur. The Gadi/Kingdom of the Sawant Bhonsle dynasty was founded by Khem Sawant I in 1627. He was rewarded Jagir from the Bijapur Adilshahis and later made himself independent, followed by Lakham Sawant the first. It was only during the period of Lakham Sawant I that the Sawant family, with Hodawade as the headquarters, came into political prominence and it is from the reign of lakham sawant that the external relations of Sawantwadi grew extensively. He along with his nephew Khem Sawant II with the army of 12000 defeated Kudal Deshastha, took possession of their land and later established themselves at Narendra Hill. The first Palace (Juna Kot) was built by them atop Narendra Hill. As Sawantwadi was a known land-power, Lakham Sawant I also established his own naval forces.

After his demise, Khem Sawant II succeeded him.

Khem Sawant II established his capital at Sundarwadi (now Sawantwadi), a hamlet of the village Charathe which later came to be known as Sawantwadi as the rulers were known as Sawants.

Sawantwadi state, when Phond Sawant II (Annasaheb) succeeded to the seat of royalty gained one additional facet and that is beginning of its relations with the English.

It was not until when Khem Sawant III married Laxmibai and thus established matrimonial alliance with the mighty Mahadji Shinde whose support to Sawantwadi brought a significant change in the internal administration and external relations.

The most notable king of Sawantwadi was Pancham Khemraj alias Bapusaheb Maharaj. He was crowned on 29 October 1924. When Mahatma Gandhi visited Sawantwadi in 1927, he called Bapusaheb Maharaj as ‘Ramraja’ and his kingdom as ‘Ramrajya’.  He passed away on 4 July 1937. In his small tenure from 1924 to 1937, he proved himself a great administrator and an ‘Ascently King’. He had devoted himself for the welfare and uplifting of his people and the terrain where they lived.

He was succeeded by his son Shivramraje Bhonsle, but he being a minor at the time, Bapusaheb’s wife Parvatidevi looked after the State as a Regent. The administration of the Sawantwadi State during her regency was marked by several reforms and progress in education.

Sovereign Queens of Sawantwadi 
It was immediately after a treaty with the Portuguese in 1700s that Ramchandra Sawant expired and, therefore, Janakibai, the regent-queen of sawantwadi was the first female to administer the affairs of State with the help of Jiwaji Vishram Sabnis, who acted as the kabhari of Sawantwadi. Following Janakibai’s administration, Laxmibai, eldest widow of Khem Sawant took the affairs of sawantwadi in her hands during 1800s. Laxmibai tremendously strengthened the power of Sawantwadi, thoroughly grasped the gravity of the situations between Sawants and Chhatrapati Shivaji III and found out a way to keep the forces of Kolhapur away. 1800s was the era when Sawantwadi had two sovereign-queen handling the administrations of the state, Durgabai (1809-1819) had cultivated friendly relations with the Portuguese. She thus, had the ability and foresight to maintain friendly relations with European powers, when sawantwadi was torn by internal conflict and confusion. In order to preserve the sawantwadi state, she adopted submissive attitude especially when there was no one to help sawantwadi against aggressive of the English.

Sawantwadi queens beautifully handled all the affairs of the state be it administrations or Art, Rajmata Satvashiladevi along with Rajasaheb Shivramraje Bhonsle are responsible for reviving the dying art of Ganjifa and lacquerware of Sawantwadi. They established Sawantwadi Lacquerwares in 1971 and managed to take the art form to the international market. After the demise of Rajesaheb, Rajmata continued her efforts in reviving and promoting the Ganjifa art. She was a master craftswoman in her own way in lacquerware, hand weaving and hand embroidery and she had also won awards for it. She truly devoted herself and took keen interest in the growth and sustenance of this art form.

Architectural Traits 
The Royal Palace of Sawantwadi is truly an architectural masterpiece that effortlessly merges the English arches with the native workmanship and the vibrant red laterite stones. The bricked brown walls add to the ethnicity of this two-storied Palace and makes it a unique, unmissable tourist attraction of Sawantwadi. The Palace has a beautiful façade square at the centre covered with an immaculate lawn and is surrounded with rooms on all four sides which is converted into a Museum. History states that the ministers and the officials of the court used to reside in these rooms during the rule. The Palace vicinity encompasses extensive gardens, trees and indeed the magnificent structure which sits pretty in the midst of this landscaped garden.

Lester Gate 
The Palace entrance is through the Lester Gate which was built in 1895. Named after the British Political Superintendent Col. Lester who had contributed in major developments of the state .

The inscription on the gate reads:

Opened for carriages and general uses

October 10, 1895

Rajebahadur Raghunath Sawant Bhonsle

Sir Desai of Sawantwadi

Colonel H. L. Nuff Political Superintendent

Rao Saheb B. H. Kumthekar State Engineer

The top of the gate is decorated with 2 finials at both ends and in between proudly stands the swallow-tailed deep saffron color flag honouring the Royal Maratha Family.

Moti Talav 
The Strategic location of the Palace with the coconut grove facing the Moti Talav further strengthens the imposing posture of the Royal Residence. The man-made lake was built in 1874. Moti Talav, located in the heart of the city, gives a beautiful panoramic view of the Narendra Hill. A bridge cuts through the lake and there is a paved pathway running around the water body, a popular hangout spot among the locals of Sawantwadi.

View of moti talav from the palace

Darbar Hall 
The foundation stone of the Palace Darbar Hall was laid by His Excellency the Governor of Mumbai, Sir James Fergusson on 21 March 1881. The Hall was completed during the reign of Raghunath Sawant Bhonsle. The Darbar Hall floor is laden with tiles which are assembled strategically so as to resemble a flower. The ceiling of the Darbar Hall is embedded with etched zinc plates and arranged to form floral motifs. The Darbar Hall was used as the hall of audience by the King and all the male officials of the State. It has balconies on both sides which were used by the Royal ladies to hear the proceedings. The two elegant chandeliers in the hall date back to the 1880s. The Darbar Hall was officially used last time for the coronation of the Present King Rajesaheb Khem Sawant VI.

Taisaheb Wada 
Wadas are a rich and esteem architectural heritage in Maharashtra known for its quadrangle construction and an open space veranda in the center, reflecting the pride, religion, culture, traditions and turbulent history of Marathas. The Taisaheb Wada was made by Raghunath Sawant Bhonsle during mid 1800’s for his second wife Yamuna Bai. The Wada is named after Yamuna Bai in view of the fact that in  Maharashtrian culture the elder female of the house is addressed as TAI. So everyone out of respect called Tai therefore the name of wada as TAISAHEB WADA.

It has got rooms on all four side giving it a look of a beautiful courtyard. Up until recently It used to have two natural drainage system In the center of the open space veranda.

Taisaheb Wada is now being turned into a boutique hotel by Yuvraj Lakham Sawant Bhonsle and Yuvrani Shraddha Lakham Sawant Bhonsle dedicating the Wada to the sovereign women of the house of Sawants, consisting of six rooms based on the six avatars of Vishnu (Dashavtar Ganjifa).

Heritage, Art and Lacquerwares 
Historically, it is a well-known fact that in the 17th and 18th centuries a number of learned Brahmins from Andhra and Telangana areas visited Sawantwadi to hold discourses in Dharmashashtra with Khem Sawant III. He was considered to be an unchallenged authority on Dharmashastra. The Brahmins brought with them the art of Ganjifa and lacquerware to Sawantwadi at that time.

Rajesaheb and his wife Rajmata Satvashiladevi are responsible for reviving the dying art of Ganjifa and lacquerware of Sawantwadi. They established Sawantwadi Lacquerwares in 1971 and managed to take the art form to the international market. He established South Ratnagiri District Shikshan Prasarak Mandal and started Shri. Pancham Khemraj Mahavidylaya in 1961. To promote women empowerment, he established Maharashtra State Handicrafts.

The Sawant Bhonsle family today is persistent in upholding the art of Ganjifa and Lacquerware.

Ganjifa 
Ganjifa are playing cards and trace back to its origin in Persia. It was brought down to India by the Mughals in the 16th Century. It is believed that Ganjifa cards arrived through Sufi saints during Mughal period. The origin of the term Ganjifa is obscure. It is said ‘Ganj’ is a Persian term meaning 'treasure, treasury or hoard' while others suggest it is from the Persian word ‘ganjifeh’ meaning ‘playing cards’.

In the royal courts, the Ganjifa card game was known as Darbar Kalam, and the materials used were ivory, tortoise shell and other rich materials. At the same time, as it went famous with masses, it was called Bazaar Kalam. Bazaar Kalam was made of cheaper materials like palm leaf, stiffened cloth, paste boards, etc. which were affordable for everyone.

The art form is divided into categories such as classical, traditional, folk and tribal. Ganjifa falls under traditional form. They are circular, rectangular and oval in shape and are handmade by the artisans. Initially the cards had Persian motifs and letters on the cards, but later to give them more Indian touch the royalty asked the artisans to incorporate native motifs and that is how, many figures from the Ramayana, Dashavtara and Rashis came along.

It is believed that by repeating the name of God, sins are remitted. Besides being a game and an art form, Dashavtara was also used to teach people about our culture and stories from our scriptures, which is why one never gambles with the Ganjifa. It was played to build a sense of community.

All the states in India had their own style of making Ganjifa cards: Bihar, Jammu & Kashmir, West Bengal, Punjab, Rajasthan, Karnataka, Andhra Pradesh, Orissa and Maharashtra. These cards have been decorated with varied images of indigenous figures and forms depicting various divinities, flora and fauna along with numerical details. Now only a few families in Mysore, Puri, Bishnupur and Sawantwadi are involved in practicing it.

About Ganjifa Cards 
Each suit in Ganjifa game has a different colour for its background. The colours typical to Sawantwadi are red, green, yellow, brown and black. The back of the cards have typically a uniform colour which is orange. It is usually played with 3 players.

The Dashavtar Ganjifa is based on the ten incarnations of Lord Vishnu. They are Matsya, Kurma, Varaha, Nrusinha, Waman, Parshuram, Ram, Krishna, Buddha and Kalkin. It is a set of 120 cards wherein there are 10 suits with 12 cards each. The 12 cards are further divided into 2 court cards which are the picture cards having the King and the Minister or Pradhan card and the other 10 are numeral cards or pip cards from Ace to 10 which have the suit signs or hukum painted on it.

Along with Dashavtar Ganjifa, Sawantwadi artists and artisans also make Dashavtar Darchitri Ganjifa, Chang Kanchan (Mughal Ganjifa), Navagraha (Nine Planets), Rashi (Zodiac sign), Dhanalakshmi, Musical Instrument, Animal, Bird, Tarot and playing cards are Indo - French, Aryadev, Oval and Double Figure.

Lacquerwares 
The craft of lacquerware was introduced in Sawantwadi around the end of 17th century by the Telangana Brahmins who came from Andhra Pradesh to hold discourses in Dharmashastra with Khem Sawant III, the then ruler of Sawantwadi. Khem Sawant III was also a patron of arts and music.

This craft and the community of artisans, the Chitaris further flourished under the Royal Patronage of the Rulers of Sawantwadi, the Sawant Bhonsles. During the 18th and the 19th centuries, various schools of this craft were started in Sawantwadi. The Ganjifa cards were made from paper that were covered with a mixture of tamarind seed powder and oil, painted and coated with lac. Presently, the painting of floral borders and motifs and mythological figures is done with water-based tempera colours and these are then covered with lacquer in order to preserve and enhance their color values.

Sawantwadi Lacquerwares was established by H. H. Rajesaheb Lt. Col. Shivram Sawant Bhonsle and H. H. Rajmata Satvashiladevi Bhonsle in 1971. Once when H.H Rajesaheb Shivramraje Bhonsle visited the Victoria and Albert Museum in London, he noticed a label reading Sawantwadi Cards. That’s when he learnt about the cards that were being made in Sawantwadi. He collected more information about it. After coming to Sawantwadi, he searched for the artists who would make such cards. He and his wife, themselves learnt the art from the 80 years old artist Pundalik Chitari who at that time would make 2 sets of Ganjifa for a year. They started Sawantwadi Lacquerwares to revive and promote the art of Ganjifa and Lacquerware. Their objective was to teach this art to the younger generation so that it can be carried forward.

Sawantwadi museum 
Sawantwadi palace also houses a museum in few of their rooms which is mainly dedicated to the Royal Family and Ganjifa- the art of sawantwadi.

The museum was opened in 2005 by Lt. Her Highness Rajmata Satvashiladevi Bhonsle. The museum collection includes photographs and paintings of the Royal Family Members, Coronation of the kings over the years, artworks by king and queen, Furniture used by the family, sculptures collected by the royal family and our very own Ganjifa Playing Cards.

Geography and climate

It is the administrative headquarters of the Sindhudurg district. Sawantwadi is situated on the west coast of Maharashtra, India, and is bounded by the Arabian Sea to its west and the Western Ghats to its east. The topography of the city ranges from plain to undulating, with several hills, valleys and flat areas within the city. The geology of the city is characterised by hard laterite in hilly tracts and sandy soil along the seashore.

The city is often used as a staging point for traffic along the Konkan Coast. Humidity is approximately 78% on average, and peaks during May, June and July. The maximum average humidity is 93% in July and average minimum humidity is 56% in January. Under the Köppen climate classification, Sawantvadi belongs to the Tropical/megathermal zone and is under the direct influence of the Arabian Sea branch of the South-West monsoon. It receives about 90% of its total annual rainfall within a period of about six months from May to October, while remaining extremely dry from December to March.

The most pleasant months in Sawantwadi are from December to February, during which time the humidity and heat are at their lowest. The summer gives way to the monsoon season, when the city experiences more precipitation than most urban centres in India, due to the Western Ghats. Rainfall up to  could be recorded during the period from June to September. The rains subside in September, with the occasional rainfall in October.

Language 

Malvani is the predominant spoken language in Sawantwadi. Marathi is the state language, spoken widely, and also the language of instruction in schools. Goan Konkani is slightly understood but not implemented. Hindi and English are also used in social communication. Most of the town's population are Hindu, followed by a minority Muslim Buddhist and Christian population.

Transport

Roads 
Sawantwadi is well connected to other towns of Sindhudurg district and cities of Maharashtra state by MSRTC buses as well as Goa & Belgaum. Private buses, Sharing Rickshaws & Bikes are used to travel locally to connect the small villages to the city.
There is a national highway 10 km away from Sawantwadi and it connects Goa to Mumbai

Rails 

Konkan Railway Corporation Limited's railway line connecting Mumbai to Mangalore, popularly known as the Konkan Railway, passes through Sawantwadi Road railway station which 6 km from the town. Trivandrum Rajdhani Express has a halt at Sawantwadi Road railway station.

Air 

Nearest Airport is Kolhapur  which is 128 km, Belgaum in Karnataka which is 110 km & mopa in Goa which is 18 km. The new airport is being built at Chipi-Parule in Vengurla Taluka.

References

External links 

 Sawatwadi Municipal Corporation

 
Cities and towns in Sindhudurg district
Konkan